Otto Bismarck Landmann  (31 August 1888 – 7 November 1975) was an Australian rules footballer who played with Essendon and Melbourne in the Victorian Football League (VFL), and with Brighton in the Victorian Football Association (VFA).

Family
The son of Frank Landmann, and Sara Landmann, née Hetherington, Otto Bismarck Landmann was born in Warrnambool on 31 August 1888.

He married Mary Gertrude Thompson (1903-1984) in 1937.

Football

Essendon (VFL)
Recruited from Warrnambool in 1907, he played 27 senior matches for Essendon, as full-forward, kicking a total of 34 goals, including seven of Essendon's eight goals in its 8.11 (59) to 6.9 (45) victory over South Melbourne on 13 June 1908.

He was selected in a representative VFL team that played against a combined Ballarat side, at the MCG on 8 June 1907. In a very one-sided match -- VFL 25.20 (170) to Ballarat 3.7 (25) -- he kicked three goals.

Melbourne (VFL)
Cleared from Essendon in 1910, he played two senior matches that season for Melbourne in the VFL.

Brighton (VFA)
In 1911 he was granted a clearance from Melbourne to play with Brighton in the VFA.

Death
He died on 7 November 1975.

Notes

References
 
 Maplestone, M., Flying Higher: History of the Essendon Football Club 1872–1996, Essendon Football Club, (Melbourne), 1996. 
 Ross, J. (ed), 100 Years of Australian Football 1897–1996: The Complete Story of the AFL, All the Big Stories, All the Great Pictures, All the Champions, Every AFL Season Reported, Viking, (Ringwood), 1996.

External links 
 
 
 Past-Player Profiles: Otto Landmann, essendonfc.com.
 Otto Landmann, Demonwiki.
 Otto Landmann, The VFA Project.

1888 births
1975 deaths
Australian rules footballers from Victoria (Australia)
Essendon Football Club players
Melbourne Football Club players
Brighton Football Club players